James P. Gray may refer to:
 Jim Gray (jurist) (James Polin Gray), American jurist, writer and Libertarian Party candidate
 Jim Gray (American politician) (James P. Gray II), mayor of Lexington, Kentucky
 James P. Gray (New Hampshire politician), member of the New Hampshire Senate, and previously of the New Hampshire House of Representatives

See also
 James Gray (disambiguation)